Comura is a trilobite in the order Phacopida that existed during the lower Devonian in what is now Eifel, Germany. It was described by Richter and Richter in 1926, and the type species is Comura cometa, originally under the genus Cryphaeus by Richter in 1909.

References

External links
 Comura at the Paleobiology Database

Devonian trilobites of Europe
Acastidae
Fossil taxa described in 1926
Fossils of Germany